Puddinghead is the third studio album by Australian indie pop band Ball Park Music, released on 4 April 2014 by Stop Start and Inertia Music.

Supported by two singles—"She Only Loves Me When I'm There" and "Trippin' the Light Fantastic",—Puddinghead was the band's first self-produced album. 

The band promoted the album with two national tours, the Puddinghead Tour in April/May 2014 and the Trippin' the Light Fantastic tour in September/October 2014. The band also embarked on a short European tour in November.

At the 2014 ARIA Music Awards, it was nominated for Best Rock Album.

At the 2014 J Awards, the album was nominated for Australian Album of the Year.

Recording and production
The album was recorded in two periods. During March 2013 and May 2013 sessions were held at the Zeehan Music Factory #1, and during June 2013 and January 2014 they were held at Evertone Studios. The album was engineered by Sam Cromack with assistance of the other band members. The album was self-produced.

Track listing

Personnel 
Musicians

 Ball Park Music – producer, engineer;
 Paul Furness – synth (1, 5), Rhodes piano (1–4, 7, 10), 8-bit keys (1), piano (2–5, 7, 9, 11), Nord flutes (2, 8, 10), Roland SH-101 (3, 9, 11), organ (4–8, 11), harpsichord (5, 7, 10), trombone (7)
 Jennifer Boyce – bass guitar (1, 3–11), vocals (all tracks)
 Sam Cromack – vocals (all tracks), writing (all tracks), guitar (all tracks), vocoder (1), bass guitar (2), synth (5, 7), acoustic guitar (7, 11), beatbox (7)
 Dean Hanson – guitar (all tracks), writing (1), trombone (5), vocals (5), hi-hat (7), acoustic guitar (10), ambient noise (11)
 Daniel Hanson – drums (all tracks), cowbell (1), tambourine (1–2, 6), electronic drums (3, 5), percussion (5, 7), synth (5), vocals (5)
 Chris Darbyshire – tenor sax (5), alto sax (5)

Additional personnel

 Tony Hoffer – mixing
 Dave Cooley – mastering
 Polly Bass Boost – artwork

Charts

Release history

References

2014 albums
Ball Park Music albums